The GZ convoys were a series of Caribbean convoys which ran during the Battle of the Atlantic in World War II.

They take their name from the route: Guantanamo, Cuba to Cristóbal, Colón, Panama

Overview 
The GZ series was the reverse of ZG series that ran from 31 August 1942 until 17 May 1945. There were 139 GZ convoys, comprising 1,151 individual ship listings. The escort ships for these convoys are not listed in the reference cited. Almost all ships listed in a convoy made the complete trip between Guantanamo and Cristóbal with a few going to Kingston, Jamaica, or Cartagena, Colombia.

The series started with GZ 1 through GZ 139 with only 1 convoy being cancelled, GZ 31. There are only two ships listed as being lost, and the losses were not due to enemy action, one grounded and broke in two and the other was from a collision.

Convoy List

1942

1943

1944

1945

Notes 
Citations

Bibliography 

Books
 
 
 
Online resources

External links 
 Full listing of ships sailing in GZ convoys

GZ 01
Battle of the Atlantic
Caribbean Sea operations of World War II